Giubilanti d'amore fraterno was the national anthem of San Marino until 1894, with music by Ulisse Balsimelli and lyrics by Aurelio Muccioli.

Lyrics

Italian version

External links
MIDI File

Sammarinese music
Historical national anthems
European anthems
National symbols of San Marino
National anthem compositions in A-flat major